Sleepy means feeling a need for sleep, also known as somnolence. It may also refer to:

People
 Sleepy (rapper) (born 1984), a South Korean rapper part of the hip hop duo Untouchable
 Sleepy Bill Burns (1880–1953), American baseball player
 Sleepy Brown (born 1970), African American musician
 Sleepy John Estes (1899–1977), African American musician
 Sleepy Floyd (born 1960), retired American professional basketball player
 Sleepy LaBeef (1935–2019), American rockabilly musician
 Sleepy Tripp (born 1953), American racecar driver
 Nikola "Sleepy" Andrews (born 1998), American Twitch streamer and former professional Overwatch player

Arts and entertainment
 Sleepy (character), one of the dwarfs in the film Snow White and the Seven Dwarfs
 Sleepy (novel), by Kate Orman based on the TV series Doctor Who
 "Sleepy" (short story), an 1888 story by Anton Chekhov

See also
 Sleep disorder, a medical disorder of the sleep patterns
 Rheum, the thin mucus discharged from the eyes, nose, or mouth during sleep
 Sleepy Creek, a tributary of the Potomac River, U.S.
 Sleepy Hollow (disambiguation)
 Sleepy time (disambiguation) or Sleepytime

Lists of people by nickname